Parliamentary elections were held in Algeria on 4 May 2017 to elect all 462 members of the People's National Assembly. The ruling National Liberation Front lost 44 seats, but remained the largest party in the People's National Assembly with 164 members.

Electoral system
The 462 members of the People's National Assembly are elected by proportional representation from 48 multi-member constituencies based on the provinces. Seats are allocated using the largest remainder method.

Campaign
Candidates began campaigning on 9 April 2017.

Parties boycotting the elections included Talaie El-Houriat and Jil Jadid, whilst the Union of Democratic and Social Forces was not authorised.

Results

References

Algeria
2017 in Algeria
Elections in Algeria
May 2017 events in Africa
Election and referendum articles with incomplete results